Lönsboda GoIF is a sports club in Lönsboda, Sweden, established on 24 September 1930 as a merger out of Lönsboda IF, Lönsboda GF, Lönsboda CK and Lönsboda Pingpongklubb.
The women's soccer team played five seasons in the Swedish top division between 1978–1982.

References

External links
Official website 

1930 establishments in Sweden
Football clubs in Skåne County
Sport in Skåne County
Association football clubs established in 1930